Chicago is a sans-serif typeface designed by Susan Kare for Apple Computer. It was used in the Macintosh operating system user interface between 1984 and 1997 and was an important part of Apple’s brand identity. It is also used in early versions of the iPod user interface. Chicago was initially a bitmap font; as the Apple OS’s capabilities improved, Apple commissioned the type foundry Bigelow & Holmes to create a vector-based TrueType version. The typeface is named after the U.S. city of Chicago, following the theme of original Macintosh fonts being named after major world cities.

Susan Kare has stated that Chicago was the first font to be developed for the Macintosh. Before the team settled on the convention of naming fonts after “world cities”, it was called Elefont (Elefont is also the name of a bold semi-serif typeface designed by Bob McGrath in 1978). The first bitmap version included only a 12 pt. version. This font, with only very minor changes to spacing, was used for menus, dialogs, window titles, and text labels, through version 7.6 of the system. The TrueType version had many differences from the bitmap version, which became more apparent at greater sizes. One of Chicago’s features was that it could remain legible while being made “grey” (to indicate a disabled menu item) by the removal of every other pixel (since actual grey type was not supported by the original Macintosh graphics hardware). The zero was slashed to distinguish it from capital “O”.

In Mac OS 8, Charcoal replaced Chicago as the default system font. Chicago continued to be distributed as a standard component of the system, and Apple even urged developers to keep designing user interfaces for the Chicago typeface, since the new alternate fonts used the Chicago metrics as a foundation.

German-language versions of the Mac OS, as well as all language versions of Mac OS 9, had a different rendering of the 12-point version of Chicago. The letter W had two dips instead of one at the bottom of the letter, the letter V had its lower tip at the centre instead of veering left, and the letter I (capital “i”) had serifs at the top and bottom, distinguishing it from l (lowercase "L"). A mix of this and the original Chicago was used in the original iPod.

Chicago was also used in Apple marketing materials. It was common to find this font in early amateur desktop publishing productions, since it was available as part of the system. While Apple gravitated away from Chicago following the adoption of the relatively easier-to-read Charcoal as part of the platinum theme in Mac OS, it was later revived in the user interface for the iPod music player, where legibility on a low resolution two-color screen once again became an asset.  With the introduction of the iPod mini, a smaller typeface was needed, and the Espy Sans font from the Apple Newton was used. Finally, with the introduction of the iPod Photo, the color iPod interface changed to Podium Sans—a bitmap font similar to the Myriad Pro typeface which Apple has adopted gradually for its marketing since 2002.

The Chicago pixel typeface was also adapted by Squaresoft for use in the English releases of their Super NES titles, such as Final Fantasy VI and Chrono Trigger.

Though the original font is no longer bundled with MacOS, two Thai-language fonts bundled with MacOS, Krungthep and Silom, use Chicago for their Latin letters and hence can be used as modern replacements.

Chicago is a registered trademark ("typeface fonts recorded on computer software"), belonging to Apple since August 1996.

Ingo Zimmermann designed the Chiq typeface, based on the Chicago typeface, supports Greek, Cyrillic, Turkish, and Pan-European languages.

See also
 Apple typography
 Fixedsys

References

External links
 "Kern Your Enthusiasm: The Friendliness of Chicago", Slate, September 18, 2014.

Apple Inc. typefaces
Sans-serif typefaces
Typefaces and fonts introduced in 1984
Typefaces designed by Susan Kare